Deborah Ann Conway  (born 8 August 1959) is an Australian rock singer-songwriter and guitarist, and had a career as a model and actress. She was a founding member of the 1980s rock band Do-Ré-Mi with their top 5 hit "Man Overboard".

Conway performs solo and has a top 20 hit single with "It's Only the Beginning" (1991). The associated album, String of Pearls, also peaked in the top 20. She won the ARIA Award for Best Female Artist at the 1992 awards. Her next album, Bitch Epic, reached the top 20 in November 1993. Conway organised and performed on the Broad Festivals from 2005 to 2008 – show-casing contemporary Australian female artists.

Career

1959–1980: Early years and The Benders
Deborah Ann Conway was born on 8 August 1959 in Melbourne, Victoria. Her father was a lawyer in Toorak and Conway attended Lauriston Girls' School – photos of her as a schoolgirl were displayed at the Sydney Jewish Museum. Later she went to University of Melbourne – modelling and singing her way through. A billboard campaign for Bluegrass jeans featured Conway's nude backside and the phrase "Get yours into Bluegrass". Other ads with Conway as a model include, Big M and Crunchie.

At the age of 18, Conway started playing guitar, and in 1980 she joined The Benders as a vocalist whilst still at university. Her father was so concerned when she joined the pop band that he sent her to a psychiatrist. Other members of The Benders included, Neville Aresca (bass guitar), Les Barker (guitars, vocals), Dorland Bray (drums, vocals), John Campbell, Daniel Solowiej and Greg Thomas (guitar, keyboards). They performed mostly in Melbourne pubs playing original material – mostly written by Conway and Thomas – and Blondie and Devo covers. Conway also wrote songs with Bray.

Conway had minor roles in Mallacoota Stampede (1979) and Hard Knocks (1980)

1981–1991: Do-Ré-Mi to Rose Amongst Thorns
In 1981, Deborah Conway and Bray relocated to Sydney and formed pop rockers Do-Ré-Mi with Helen Carter on bass guitar and Stephen Philip on guitar. They recorded two albums, Domestic Harmony (1985) and The Happiest Place in Town (1988), and eight singles. Their best performed hit, "Man Overboard", peaked at No. 5 on the Australia Kent Music Report Singles Chart and became the 8th highest positioned Australian song on the 1985 End of Year Chart. In the early 1980s, Conway was the domestic partner of Paul Hester – drummer for Deckchairs Overboard and then Split Enz – before he left for Los Angeles in 1985 and formed Crowded House there.

Deborah Conway played the lead role of "Julie" in an Australian teenage road movie called Running on Empty, which was released in 1982.

In late 1983, Conway supplied vocals for actor Tracy Mann's singing in the Australian Broadcasting Corporation (ABC) TV series Sweet and Sour (1984) including the hit title song, "Sweet and Sour". Two soundtrack albums and three singles from the series were credited to The Takeaways (and Various Artists). Conway sang lead vocals on half the songs and backing vocals on almost all the rest. Conway had minor roles in The Coca-Cola Kid (1985)

In 1986 Conway performed with The Rock Party, a charity project initiated by The National Campaign Against Drug Abuse, which included many Australasian musicians: Neil Finn, Eddie Rayner, Tim Finn, Nick Seymour and Hester (all from Crowded House); Geoff Stapleton, Robbie James and Mark Callaghan (all from GANGgajang); Reg Mombassa and Martin Plaza (both from Mental As Anything); Andrew Barnum and Lissa Barnum (Vitabeats); Mary Azzopardi (Rockmelons), Michael Barclay, Peter Blakeley, Jenny Morris, Danny De Costa, Greg Herbert (The Promise), Spencer P Jones, Sean Kelly (Models), John Kennedy, Paul Kelly, Robert Susz (Dynamic Hepnotics), and Rick Swinn (The Venetians). The Rock Party released a 12" single "Everything to Live For", which was produced by Joe Wissert, Phil Rigger and Phil Beazley.

Do-Ré-Mi disbanded in 1988 not long after their second album was released. Rolling Stone (Australia) named Conway 'Best Australian Female Singer' for that year.

While Do-Ré-Mi were working in England in 1988, Conway became involved in Pete Townshend's project The Iron Man: The Musical by Pete Townshend. Shortly afterwards she recorded an album of dance music in Los Angeles which was not released except for a solo single, a cover of Bad Company's "Feel Like Makin' Love" (1990), produced by Scott Cutler.

In 1990, Conway formed Drawcards as a semi-acoustic band with Vika and Linda, Stephen Cummings, Dror Erez, Tim Finn, Ross Hannaford, Peter Jones, Shane O'Mara and Chris Wilson. Almost immediately it split with half its members – Conway, Hester, Erez, Jones and Wilson – forming Rose Amongst Thorns as a pub rock band from 1990 to 1991.

1991–1996: String of Pearls & Bitch Epic

In 1991, Conway played Juno in Peter Greenaway's Prospero's Books, singing a setting of William Shakespeare's masque from The Tempest to music by Michael Nyman.

Deborah Conway's debut solo album was released in October 1991, titled String of Pearls, which peaked at No. 20 on the ARIA Albums Chart. The album was produced by Richard Pleasance, Joe Hardy and Michael den Elzen. Singles from the album include "It's Only the Beginning" which reached No. 19 on the ARIA Singles Chart in August, "Under My Skin" (December) and "Release Me" (February 1992), all three of which were co-written with Scott Cutler. For her work on the album, she won ARIA Award for Best Female Artist at the ARIA Music Awards of 1992. To support the releases, Deborah Conway and the Mothers of Pearl was formed with Alan Harding (keyboards), Peter Jones (drums, ex-Drawcards and Rose Amongst Thorns), Bill McDonald (bass guitar) and Willy Zygier (guitar). Conway and Zygier became domestic partners and have written and performed much of Conway's subsequent material.

Conway released her second album Bitch Epic in 1993, which peaked at No. 18 and was produced by Jim Rondinelli and Zygier. The cover features an upper body shot of a topless Conway, covered in Nutella (a hazelnut spread) and cream, as she is about to eat a slice of cake thereby illustrating the concept of Gluttony (see album cover at right) for ABC TV mini-series Seven Deadly Sins (1993). Conway, Paul Kelly, Vika Bull and Renée Geyer, provided vocals and song writing for the related soundtrack. An eight-track extended play of live songs was added to Bitch Epic to form 1994's Epic Theatre, which was produced by Zygier. Her backing band were Zygier, Harding, McDonald and Hughie Benjamin (ex-Yothu Yindi) on drums.

Ultrasound, an experimental band, with Conway, Zygier, McDonald and Hester, recorded and produced their self-titled album, Ultrasound (1995). At the end of the year, Conway and Zygier relocated to England with their newborn daughter.

In 1996, a portrait of Conway as Medusa, painted by Rosemary Valadon, was a finalist in the Archibald Prize. The prize is awarded for the "best portrait painting preferentially of some man or woman distinguished in Art, Letters, Science or Politics".

1997–2003: My Third Husband to Only the Bones

Conway recorded a new album My Third Husband with Dave Anderson producing and, after returning to Australia in mid-1997, it was released in October 1997.

In May 2000, Conway released her fourth studio album, Exquisite Stereo, on Shock Records. Her backing band, Deborah Conway and the City of Women, was Zygier, Cameron Reynolds (samples), Edmond Amendola (bass guitar) and Dave Williams (drums) – the latter two are members of Augie March. This was much more of a rock record than previous releases, it "was a mature album featuring a wide variety of styles, from acoustic love song ("You Come to Earth") and Radiohead-styled epics ("Interzone") to full tilt rockers ("I Lay Down on My Pillow and Cried All Night")".

Following Exquisite Stereo, Conway played the lead role of Patsy Cline in the Australian stage production of Always... Patsy Cline and recorded a covers album of Cline's songs, called PC: The Songs of Patsy Cline (2001), which was produced by Zygier and Reynolds. She supported the release by touring as Deborah Conway and the Patsy Clones which contained Zygier and Reynolds, and Gerry Hale.

Only the Bones is Conway's compilation album which was released in 2002. The cover showed Conway at a table picking over a meal. The album was re-titled Definitive Collection, with a different cover, and re-released in 2004.

Conway performed Dreaming Transportation: Voice Portraits of the First Women of White Settlement at Port Jackson which was scripted and directed by Andrée Greenwell. The performance premiered at the Sydney Festival in 2003 and a year later was staged again, at the Sydney Opera House. Performing with Conway were Susan Prior, Christine Douglas, Amie McKenna and Jeannie Van de Velde and musicians, Hope Csuturos (violin), James Nightingale (clarinet, saxophone), Jane Williams (cello), Kim Poole (guitar/mandolin), Denise Papaluca (piano), Mardi Chillingworth (double bass) and Jared Underwood (percussion). The work was inspired by a series of poems by Jordie Albiston.

2004–present: Conway and Zygier

In August 2004, Conway released Summertown, under the name of Conway and Zygier on the Another Intercorps label and was produced by Conway, Zygier and Hale. It has a 1960s folk-pop sound to it. Conway and Zygier supported sales by appearing in fan's homes. Brisbane group, george, recorded Do-Ré-Mi's hit single "Man Overboard", with Conway providing vocals, on their 2004 single "Still Real". Katie Noonan from george also performed with Conway in Broad 2005. In 2005, Conway provided vocals for Man Bites God's single "Bride of the Dragon" from their album The Popular Alternative, the associated video is anime based.

From 2005 to 2008, Deborah Conway collaborated with different female artists to tour Australia as part of the Broad Festival project. Each year's roster performed their own and each other's songs. Sara Storer, Katie Noonan, Ruby Hunter, Conway and Clare Bowditch were Broad 2005. Melinda Schneider, Mia Dyson, Kate Miller-Heidke, Conway and Ella Hooper were Broad 2006. Anne McCue, Sally Seltmann, Conway, Jade Macrae and Abbe May were Broad 2007. Laura Jean, Elana Stone, Liz Stringer, Dianna Corcoran and Conway were Broad 2008.

Since 2008, Conway is artistic director of the Queensland Music Festival which runs biennially in late July in odd-numbered years.

In May 2010, Conway and Zygier released Half Man Half Woman, which was produced by James Black (from stage band for RocKwiz) who also provided keyboards. The album included a track, "Into the Blue" recorded with Conway and Zygier joined by their three daughters, Syd, Alma and Hettie on vocals. The Age'''s Michael Dwyer observed that Conway and Zygier did not compromise, "from [Zygier's] jaunty Wes Montgomery-styled instrumental overture to a charming banjo lullaby featuring their three daughters, it fairly saunters with a relaxed resolve to be whatever it wants to be".

February 2013 saw the release of 'Stories of Ghosts' an unbeliever's examination of Old Testament themes from a Jewish perspective, exploring the connections between ancient practice and modern life. Receiving positive reviews throughout Australia's music press including 4 stars in Rolling Stone and Album of the week on ABC Radio National. Conway and Zygier spent the majority of 2013 touring this CD around Australia to high critical praise.

In August 2016, Conway announced the release of her ninth studio album Everybody's Begging on 2 September 2016. The album is a collection of mainly acoustic songs about an unbeliever’s take on Old Testament themes from a Jewish perspective. This was accompanied by a tour in August and September.

A portrait of Conway by Lewis Miller was a finalist in the 2022 Archibald Prize.

In December 2022, Conway was inducted into the Music Victoria Hall of Fame.

Personal life
Conway was in a relationship with Paul Hester before he moved to Los Angeles in 1985.
Conway is married to guitarist and musical collaborator Willy Zygier. They have three children.

Discography
Studio albums

Soundtrack albums

Compilation albums

 EPs 

Singles

Charity singles

See also
 Do-Re-Mi (band)

Awards and nominations
Conway was honoured with the Order of Australia in 2002 "For services to music"

ARIA Music Awards
The ARIA Music Awards is an annual awards ceremony that recognises excellence, innovation, and achievement across all genres of Australian music. They Commenced in 1987.

|-
| rowspan="6"| 1992
| rowspan="4"| Strings of Pearls
| Best Female Artist
| 
|-
| Album of the Year
|  
|-
| Best Cover Art
| 
|-
| Breakthrough Artist - Album
| 
|-
| rowspan="2"| "It's Only the Beginning"
| Single of the Year
| 
|-
| Breakthrough Artist - Single
| 
|-
| 1993
| "Release Me"
| Best Female Artist
| 
|-
| rowspan="2"| 1994
| rowspan="2"| Bitch Epic
| Best Female Artist
| 
|-
| Best Cover Art
| 
|-

Countdown Music Awards
Countdown was an Australian pop music TV series on national broadcaster ABC-TV from 1974–1987, it presented music awards from 1979–1987, initially in conjunction with magazine TV Week. The TV Week / Countdown Awards were a combination of popular-voted and peer-voted awards.

|-
| 1986
| Deborah Conway in "Guns and Butter" by Do-Re-Mi 
| Best Female Performance in a Video
| 
|-

Don Banks Music Award
The Don Banks Music Award was established in 1984 to publicly honour a senior artist of high distinction who has made an outstanding and sustained contribution to music in Australia. It was founded by the Australia Council in honour of Don Banks, Australian composer, performer and the first chair of its music board.

|-
| 2020
| Deborah Conway
| Don Banks Music Award
| 
|-

Helpmann Awards
The Helpmann Awards is an awards show, celebrating live entertainment and performing arts in Australia, presented by industry group Live Performance Australia since 2001. Note: 2020 and 2021 were cancelled due to the COVID-19 pandemic.
 

! 
|-
| 2002
| Deborah Conway - Always … Patsy Cline
| Helpmann Award for Best Female Actor in a Musical
| 
|
|-
| 2017
| Deborah Conway - The Beginning & The End (with Willy Zygier )
| Helpmann Award for Best Australian Contemporary Concert
| 
|
|-

Music Victoria Awards
The Music Victoria Awards are an annual awards night celebrating Victorian music. They commenced in 2005.

! 
|-
| 2022 || Deborah Conway || Hall of Fame ||  || 
|-

National Live Music Awards
The National Live Music Awards (NLMAs) are a broad recognition of Australia's diverse live industry, celebrating the success of the Australian live scene. The awards commenced in 2016.

|-
| National Live Music Awards of 2019
| Deborah Conway
| Live Legends (Hall of Fame)
| 
|-

References

General
  Note: Archived [on-line] copy has limited functionality.
Specific

External links

1959 births
ARIA Award winners
Australian women singer-songwriters
Australian women guitarists
Do-Re-Mi (band)
Living people
Singers from Melbourne
Jewish Australian musicians
Members of the Order of Australia
People educated at Lauriston Girls' School
People from Caulfield, Victoria